NVR may refer to:

Transport
 Naval Vessel Register, the United States Navy ship inventory
 Nene Valley Railway, a heritage railway in England
 Yurievo Airport, Velikiy Novgorod, Russia, by airport code
 Northern Vermont Railroad, a former class III railroad that operated in Vermont from 1996 to 2002.
 Napa Valley Railroad, a class III railroad that operates in The Napa Valley, in California.  The common carrier for Napa Valley Wine Train

Other uses
 Nonviolent resistance
 NVR, Inc., an American homebuilder based in Virginia
 Network video recorder, a digital video recorder that records data to a network storage device, such as a NAS device, file server or FTP server 
 North Vietnamese Regular, a soldier in the Vietnam People's Army
 No Volatage Release, a type of switch